The 1983 All-Ireland Senior Club Hurling Championship final was a hurling match played at Croke Park on 17 April 1983 to determine the winners of the 1982–83 All-Ireland Senior Club Hurling Championship, the 13th season of the All-Ireland Senior Club Hurling Championship, a tournament organised by the Gaelic Athletic Association for the champion clubs of the four provinces of Ireland. The final was contested by Loughgiel Shamrocks of Antrim and St. Rynagh's of Offaly, with the game ending in a 1-8 to 2-5 draw. The replay took place at Casement Park on 24 April 1983. Loughgiel Shamrocks won that game by 2-12 to 1-12.

The All-Ireland final was a unique occasion as it was the first ever championship meeting between Loughgiel Shamrocks and St. Rynagh's. It remains their only championship meeting at this level. Both sides were hoping to win their first All-Ireland title.

Victory for Loughgiel Shamrocks secured their first All-Ireland title. They became the 8th club to win the All-Ireland title, while they were the first, and to date only, Antrim representatives to claim the ultimate prize.

Match details

Drawn match

Replay

References

1983 in hurling
All-Ireland Senior Club Hurling Championship Finals
Antrim GAA matches
Offaly GAA matches